Omiodes meyricki is a species of moth in the family Crambidae. It was described by Charles Swinhoe in 1907 and is found on Sulawesi in Indonesia.

References

Moths described in 1907
meyricki